Nola triquetrana, the three-spotted nola, is a species of nolid moth in the family Nolidae.

The MONA or Hodges number for Nola triquetrana is 8992.

References

Further reading

 
 
 

triquetrana
Articles created by Qbugbot
Moths described in 1856